Łoskoń Stary , known also as Stary Łoskoń ("Old Łoskoń"), is a village in the administrative district of Gmina Murowana Goślina, within Poznań County, Greater Poland Voivodeship, in west-central Poland. It is close to a small lake (Łoskoń Lake) and expanses of forest.

References

Villages in Poznań County